Parasenegalia visco is a perennial tree found at higher elevations in northern Argentina, Bolivia, Chile and Peru. It has also been introduced to Africa. Common names for it include arca, visco, viscote, viscote blanco and viscote negro.
It grows 6–25m tall and it has fragrant yellow flowers in the Spring.  In Bolivia is found at an altitude of 1500–3000m. It has light to dark reddish brown twigs and small white flowers. It is cultivated for use in cabinetmaking.

Methanol extract of Senegalia visco has been shown to have short-term and long-term anti-inflammatory effects in lab rats.  Among the class of compounds characterized from S. visco leaves, the triterpenoid lupeol, α-amyrin and β-amyrin may be mainly responsible for the pharmacological activities.

References

External links 
Senegalia visco (as Acacia visco) (www.fieldmuseum.org)

Parasenegalia visco
Trees of South America
Trees of Africa
Least concern plants